Brighton College may refer to:

 Brighton College, Brighton, England, UK
 Brighton College Preparatory School, Brighton, England, UK; part of Brighton College
 Brighton College Abu Dhabi, Abu Dhabi, United Arab Emirates; see Brighton College
 Brighton College (Canada), British Columbia, Canada
 Brighton College, Manly, a former girls' private school in Manly, New South Wales, Australia
 Brighton Secondary College, Bayside, Brighton East, Victoria, Australia
 City College Brighton & Hove, Brighton, Brighton and Hove, East Sussex, England, UK
 Brighton Hove & Sussex Sixth Form College, Hove, East Sussex, England, UK
 University of Brighton, England. UK; formed by the merger of Brighton College of Art and Brighton College of Technology and Brighton College of Education
 the colleges of the University of Brighton
 Brighton International College, part of the University of Brighton

See also
 Brighton and Sussex University Hospitals NHS Trust
 Brighton and Sussex Medical School, Brighton, Sussex, England, UK
 Brighton Hill Community School, Brighton Hill, Basingstoke, Hampshire, England, UK
 Brighton International University, Casamance, Senegal
 Brighton High School (disambiguation)
 Brighton School (disambiguation)
 Brighton (disambiguation)